Prunus americana, commonly called the American plum, wild plum, or Marshall's large yellow sweet plum, is a species of Prunus native to North America from Saskatchewan and Idaho south to New Mexico and east to Québec, Maine and Florida.

Prunus americana has often been planted outside its native range and sometimes escapes cultivation. It is commonly confused with the Canada plum (Prunus nigra), although the fruit is smaller and rounder and bright red as opposed to yellow. Many cultivated varieties have been derived from this species. It forms an excellent stock upon which to graft the domestic plum.

Description

It is adapted to coarse- and medium-textured soils, but not to fine soils (silt or clay). Beneficially, the shrub survives harsh winters, down to temperatures of -40 degrees (Fahrenheit); but has little tolerance for shade, drought, or fire. Its growth is most active in spring and summer; it blooms in spring and starts fruiting in summer. It propagates naturally by seed, expanding as a stand relatively slowly, due to its long time to maturity when grown from seed.

The roots are shallow, widely spread, and send up suckers. The numerous stems per plant become scaly with age. The tree has a crown width and height of 10 feet at maturity. The branches are thorny. The leaves are alternately arranged, with an oval shape. The upper surface of the leaf is dark green; the underside is smooth and pale. The small white flowers with five petals occur singly or in clusters in the leaf axils.

Taxonomy
Prunus americana var. lanata Sudw is considered a synonym of Prunus mexicana, and Prunus americana var. nigra is considered a synonym of Prunus nigra.

Chickasaw plum (Prunus angustifolia Marsh.) hybridizes naturally with P. americana to produce P. × orthosepala Koehne.

In cultivation, many crosses have been made between American plum and other Prunus species, including Prunus persica, the peach.

Uses
The American plum is used for both ornamental and culinary purposes. The white flowers are decorative in spring and its short, single leader makes it a popular residential landscape tree. Sargent says of it: "As an ornamental plant P. americana has real value; the long wand-like branches form a wide, graceful head which is handsome in winter and in spring is covered with masses of pure white flowers followed by ample bright foliage and abundant showy fruit." More than 200 forms of American plum have been grown for cultivation. The sour and sweet fruit is eaten fresh and is processed as preserves, jellies, jam and wine.

Farms use medium to tall shrubs or trees for windbreaks, and highway or riverside plantings. Its high density of growth effectively reduces the wind velocity near the ground. Development of suckers from the root system makes American plum effective in stabilizing stream banks and gullies. It will tolerate several days of flooding. Some commercial properties plant the trees along the entrance road.

Many birds and animals eat the fruit, and both white-tailed deer and mule deer feed on twigs and leaves.

Traditionally, American plum was extensively used by Native Americans. Eastern Native Americans planted many trees giving many places the name of Crab Orchard.

The Plains Indians and Cheyenne ate the plums; the latter used the branches for the Sun Dance. The Navajo used the roots to make a red dye.

In culture

American plums are described in Laura Ingalls Wilder's On the Banks of Plum Creek (1937):

Notes

References

External links

American plum, Virginia Tech Department of Forestry Tree identification
Fryer, Janet L. 2010. Prunus americana. In: United States department of Agriculture, National Forest Service, Fire Effects Information System

americana
Edible fruits
Flora of the Eastern United States
Flora of the Western United States
Fruits originating in North America
Trees of Canada
Trees of the United States
Plants used in Native American cuisine
Plants described in 1785
americana
Trees of the Eastern United States
Trees of the Western United States
Trees of the Southern United States
Trees of North America
Trees of the Plains-Midwest (United States)
Trees of the North-Central United States
Trees of the Great Lakes region (North America)
Trees of the Northeastern United States
Trees of the South-Central United States
Trees of the Southeastern United States
Trees of Eastern Canada